HD 4203 is a single star in the equatorial constellation of Pisces, near the northern constellation border with Andromeda. It has a yellow hue and is too faint to be viewed with the naked eye, having an apparent visual magnitude of 8.70. The distance to this object is 266 light years based on parallax, but it is drifting closer to the Sun with a radial velocity of −14 km/s.

This object is an ordinary G-type main-sequence star with a stellar classification of G5V. It is photometrically-stable star with an inactive chromosphere, and has a much higher than normal metallicity. The star is roughly 6.3 billion years old and is spinning with a projected rotational velocity of 5.6 km/s. It has 12% more mass than the Sun and a 35% greater radius. HD 4203 is radiating 1.68 times the luminosity of the Sun from its photosphere at an effective temperature of 5,666 K.

Planetary system
Radial velocity observations of this star during 2000–2001 found a variability that suggesting an orbited sub-stellar companion, designated component 'b'. Additional observations led to a refined orbital period of 432 days with a relatively high eccentricity of 0.52 for a gas giant companion. The presence of a second companion was deduced from residuals in the data, then confirmed in 2014. However, the orbital elements for this companion, component 'c', are poorly constrained.

See also
 HD 4208
 HD 4308
 List of extrasolar planets

Notes

External links

G-type main-sequence stars
Planetary systems with two confirmed planets
Pisces (constellation)
BD=+19 117
004203
003502